Sun Ying (born December 1936) is a People's Republic of China politician. He was born in Baodi District, Tianjin. He graduated from Shanxi Normal University in 1958. He was Chinese Communist Party Committee Secretary of Taiyuan, Shanxi from 1987 to 1992. He was governor (1996–1998) and Communist Party Committee Secretary (1998–2001) of Gansu.

References

1936 births
People's Republic of China politicians from Tianjin
Chinese Communist Party politicians from Tianjin
Shanxi Normal University alumni
Communist Party Committee Secretaries of Taiyuan
Governors of Gansu
Living people